Callum Saunders (born 16 October 1995) is a New Zealand track cyclist, who competes in sprinting events. He competed in the team sprint for the final at the 2020 Summer Olympics. He is considered to be a pioneer of the shaved head, or "dome" haircut, in pursuit of improved aerodynamics. Studies into the aerodynamic gain of this style are ongoing.

Major results

2016
 3rd Team sprint, National Track Championships
2017
 2nd Team sprint, National Track Championships
2018
 3rd  Team sprint, Oceania Track Championships
 National Track Championships
2nd Keirin
2nd Sprint
3rd Kilometer
3rd Team sprint
2019
 2019–20 UCI World Cup
1st Keirin, Hong Kong
 National Track Championships
2nd Keirin
2nd Team sprint

References

External links

1995 births
Living people
New Zealand male cyclists
New Zealand track cyclists
People from Blenheim, New Zealand
Cyclists at the 2020 Summer Olympics
Olympic cyclists of New Zealand
Cyclists at the 2022 Commonwealth Games
Commonwealth Games competitors for New Zealand
21st-century New Zealand people